The basilar part of pons, also known as basis pontis, is the ventral part of the pons; the dorsal part is known as the pontine tegmentum.

The basilar pons makes up two thirds of the pons within the brainstem. It has a ridged appearance with a shallow groove at the midline. This groove is called the basilar sulcus and is covered by the basilar artery, which feeds into the Circle of Willis and provides blood supply to the brainstem and cerebellum. The basilar pons has this kind of appearance due to the fibers that come out of the pons and enter the cerebellum. This part of the brainstem contains fibers from the corticospinal tract (a descending pathway for neurons to reach other structures in the body), pontine nuclei, and transverse pontine fibers. The corticospinal tract carries neurons from the primary motor cortex in the brain to the spinal cord, aiding in voluntary motor movement of the body. In addition to passing through the basilar pons, corticospinal tract fibers go through other structures of the brainstem, such as the internal capsule and the crus cerebri.

An integral part of the basilar pons is the pontine nuclei. The pontine nuclei are responsible for projecting axons that go to the opposite cerebellar hemisphere through the middle cerebellar peduncle. Doing this makes the axons change into the transverse pontine fibers. The fibers of the pontine nuclei are all important to motor function, including fiber bundles such as the corticospinal fibers and corticopontine-pontocerebellar system. Specifically, the basilar pons contains all the corticofugal fibers, which include the corticospinal, corticobulbar (or corticonuclear), and corticopontine fibers. The basal pontine nuclei provides the most information to the cerebellum. These pontine nuclei are integral in helping the basilar pons carry information from the cerebral cortex to the cerebellum. The basilar pons is able to do this via the corticopontine fibers that it receives. Once the information passes from the cerebral cortex to the basilar pons and then finally to the cerebellum, the cerebellum gets information regarding complex cognitive functions.

Clinical significance
Tissue death (infarction), in this region can impair motor functioning. A lacunar stroke of the base of the pons is known to cause contralateral dysarthria-clumsy hand syndrome.

The basis pons undergoes demyelination in the condition known as central pontine myelinolysis.  This condition is due to the rapid intravenous correction of hyponatremia.

References

External links
 https://web.archive.org/web/20080221222726/http://isc.temple.edu/neuroanatomy/lab/atlas/pmjdc/
 https://web.archive.org/web/20080602013108/http://pathcuric1.swmed.edu/PathDemo/cns1/cns1140.htm
 https://web.archive.org/web/20080829001215/http://isc.temple.edu/neuroanatomy/lab/atlas/panfc/
 https://web.archive.org/web/20080526141946/http://www.sci.uidaho.edu/med532/pons.htm

Pons